John Magee may refer to:

John Magee (bishop) (born 1936), Roman Catholic Bishop Emeritus of Cloyne, the former private secretary of Popes Paul VI, John Paul I and John Paul II
John Magee (congressman) (1794–1868), US Representative from New York State
John Magee (missionary) (1884–1953), American Episcopal pastor who filmed Nanking massacre victims
John Gillespie Magee Jr. (1922–1941), American aviator and poet
John Alexander Magee (1827–1903), US Representative from Pennsylvania
John Magee (American football) (1923–1991), American football player for the Philadelphia Eagles
Johnny Magee (born 1978), Irish Gaelic footballer
Jack Magee (1883–1968), American track and field coach
John L. Magee (artist) (c. 1820s–1870s?), American artist and lithographer
John L. Magee (chemist) (1914–2005), American radiation chemist
John W. Magee (1859–?), American Medal of Honor recipient

See also
John McGee (disambiguation)